The Cuban government directly prevents access to certain websites. While preventing access to certain websites is present, it is not particularly extensive. Limited access to the Internet through limited internet infrastructure is the main problem with Internet access in Cuba.

 Cuba is listed as "not free" in the Freedom on the Net 2018 report from Freedom House, with an overall score of 79 out of 100 where 100 is the least free. This is the fifth highest score out of the 65 countries ranked, below China, Iran, Syria, and Ethiopia. Cuba has been listed as "not free" each year since the reports started in 2009.
 Cuba has been listed as an "Internet Enemy" by Reporters Without Borders since the list was created in 2006. 
 The level of Internet filtering in Cuba is not categorized by the OpenNet Initiative due to a lack of data.
Internet in Cuba is limited due to current government rules and regulations but also due to US sanctions that block Cuban access to some platforms like Zoom. Cuba's Internet connection is via the ALBA-1 cable to Venezuela. The United States refuses to allow an undersea cable to pass 100 miles from Cuba to Florida.

Background

Surveillance and self-censorship 

Reports have shown that the Cuban government uses Avila Link software to monitor citizens use of the Internet. By routing connections through a proxy server, the government is able to obtain citizens' usernames and passwords. Cuban ambassador Miguel Ramirez has argued that Cuba has the right to "regulate access to [the] Internet and avoid hackers, stealing passwords, [and] access to pornographic, satanic cults, terrorist or other negative sites".

Reporters Without Borders suspects that Cuba obtained some of its internet surveillance technology from China, which has supplied other countries such as Zimbabwe and Belarus. Cuba does not enforce the same level of internet keyword censorship as China.

Limited access to the Internet 
All material intended for publication on the Internet must first be approved by the National Registry of Serial Publications. Service providers may not grant access to individuals not approved by the government. One report found that many foreign news outlet websites are not blocked in Cuba, but the slow connections and outdated technology in Cuba makes it impossible for citizens to load these websites.

Because of limited bandwidth, authorities give preference to developing internet infrastructure in locations where the Internet can be accessed on a collective basis, such as in work places, schools, and research centers, where many people have access to the same computers or network.

Despite these limitations, Internet access is seen as essential for Cuba's economic development. Roughly 4.5 million people or about 39% of the population had access to Internet in 2018, up from 1.6 million in 2008. There were 1.2 million computers available on the island in 2018, up from 630,000 in 2008.

Limitations despite increased Internet access 
In recent times, censorship of the Internet has slowly relaxed. For example, in 2007, it became possible for members of the public to legally buy a computer. Digital media is starting to play a more important role, bringing news of events in Cuba to the rest of the world. In spite of restrictions, Cubans connect to the Internet at embassies, Internet cafés, through friends at universities, hotels, and work. As telecommunication infrastructure develops, cellphone availability is increasing. Starting on 4 June 2013 Cubans could sign up with Etecsa, the state telecom company, for public Internet access at 118 centers across the country. Juventud Rebelde, an official newspaper, said new areas of the Internet would gradually become available.

Despite increasing access the government still has a history of limiting access to the internet. Alan Phillip Gross, under employment with a contractor for the U.S. Agency for International Development, was arrested in Cuba on 3 December 2009 and was convicted on 12 March 2011 for covertly distributing laptops and cellular phones on the island, and released in 2014. The rise of digital media in Cuba has led the government to be increasingly worried about these tools; U.S. diplomatic cables published by WikiLeaks in December 2010 revealed that US diplomats believed that the Cuban government is more afraid of bloggers than of "traditional" dissidents. The government has increased its own presence on blogging platforms with the number of "pro-government" blogging platforms on the rise since 2009.

State control of telecommunications 
Access to the internet in Cuba is controlled by the Empresa de Telecommunicaciones de Cuba S.A. (ETECSA), a state-owned monopoly. Access to the internet is granted through temporary or permanent accounts which last 30 days and 360 days, respectively. Temporary accounts are mostly used by foreign tourists, while permanent accounts are mostly used by Cuban citizens. Although an estimated 32.5% of the population had access to the internet as of 2017 the vast majority of those people only have access to the intranet that is offered by the government. The intranet includes access to an email service that can be used with the country, educational and cultural materials that are provided largely by government institutions, state sponsored media links, and some foreign websites that demonstrate support for the Cuban government. The most popular sites that are offered through the intranet service include EcuRed, a Wikipedia like service that is offered in Spanish that attempts to "create and disseminate knowledge from a decolonizing point of view". The percentage of the population that has access to the global internet is far smaller at only 5% of the population in 2014.

Cuba does not have the infrastructure and individuals have insufficient incomes to make home Wi-Fi broadly available, forthy most Cubans access Wi-Fi through public means including the "ParkNets" and the Joven Club. The ParkNets are public Wi-Fi hotspots often located in parks where the vast majority of Cubans go to visit there Wi-Fi. There are 421 public Wi-Fi hotspots in all of Cuba, and 67 of those hotspots are located in the capital city of Havana. Most Wi-Fi is accessed by Cubans is in these public areas, as a result Cubans overwhelmingly access the internet through mobile devices, with among the most popular apps in Cuba being communication apps Facebook Messenger and WhatsApp which are often used to contact family that is living abroad. The other method through which Cubans access the internet is the Joven Clubs, or Youth Club, which are government provided computer centers where the public can access both the intranet and internet by providing identification. By using identification codes for every person that accesses the internet, the government is likely able to track the online behavior of everyone that is using the internet which may result in some degree of self censorship in the population.

Cost of Internet access 
Until 2018, Two kinds of online connections are offered in Cuban Internet cafes: a 'national' one that is restricted to a simple intranet service operated by the government, and an 'international' one that gives access to the entire Internet. The general population can access the former for .10 CUC an hour, while the later costs 1.50 CUC an hour. Most people in Cuba are paid a salary of $25 per month by the Cuban government, and even people who are employed by foreign firms still only make a salary of $30 per month. With such low incomes and the relatively expensive cost of internet, most Cubans who access the internet are motivated to use the lower cost Cuban intranet rather than the global internet. This means that of the Cubans who are able to access the internet, most of them are accessing the content that is either created directly by the government or curated by the government and far more highly censored than the global internet. The cost of internet access restricts access to the internet and limits access to the global internet even if the local intranet is accessible.

Until 2018, Residential internet is also very expensive at 15 CUC per month for the cheapest plan and 70 CUC per month for the plan that offers the fastest quality internet. These services represent a cost that is excess of the majority or all of the salary of the vast majority of the Cuban population. Similarly, internet for businesses is out of reach for all but the most wealthy customers with monthly costs that are at least 100 CUC a month for direct access to the global internet for the slowest service and at a maximum of over 30,000 CUC a month for the fastest service that is offered. As a result, the vast majority of Cuban residences and businesses do not have access to the internet.

Since 2018, the prices of access to the Internet began to decrease. For 2021, one hour to access Internet through public Wi Fi cost 1.50 CUP. Access to the national network, 0.50 CUP. The minimum  data mobile package down to 110 CUP by 600 Mbs and a bonus for 4G lines, combining also messages and calls.  Since 2018, access to the Internet by mobile data is available. In 2019, 7.1 millions of Cubans could access the Internet. The prices of connections, since[clarification needed] WiFi zones, or mobile data, or from houses through the "Nauta Hogar" service have been decreasing, specially since the economic reform of January 2021, when all the salaries increased by at least 5 times, and the prices of the Internet remain in the same point. In 2021, 7.7 millions of Cuban people accessing the Internet were reported.

El Paquete 
In an attempt to deliver media to the Cuban public without unreliable digital means, some Cubans have gone as far as hand delivering content to the user through the use of portable hard drives. This allows individuals to avoid having to use internet circumvention tools altogether and presents a more straight forward approach to gathering content for those who are not as technically adept or do not have the resources to gather content from the internet. El Paquete Semanal, or the weekly package in English, is the local name for the digital content that is delivered to Cuba on a weekly basis. The content that is delivered through El Paquete consists of a variety of digital media, including music, television shows, movies, news articles, foreign software, and mobile applications. This media is delivered to a computer owned by a local vendor in Cuba and then sold to Cuban citizens who come and download the content that they would wish to consume from a computer onto a USB to use in their own homes. The content of El Paquete is often entertainment and information driven rather than an attempt to smuggle in content that is explicitly negative towards the Cuban government. El Paquete forms a sort of crude offline internet where the Cuban population can gain access to a tremendous amount of digital content despite the lack of information technology infrastructure within the country.

However, since the availability of mobile data (2018) and a more good prices, most of Cuban access Internet and his contents more easily, so, "El paquete" has lost relevance.

StreetNets (SNet) 
StreetNets is a name used to refer to the local mesh networks that are built by Cuban citizens in order to connect localities to a private network that is outside of the view of the government and can operate in a way that is completely uncensored. Members of the mesh networks are able to communicate online privately with one another and share files through the network without fear of government oversight or censorship. The mesh network is formed by a series of Wi-Fi antennas and Ethernet cables that are connected to one another and are able to bring hundreds of computers onto a single network. It is estimated that over 9,000 computers in the capital city of Havana are connected to some form of a mesh network. As mentioned above, all internet is controlled by the ETECSA, so ownership of Wi-Fi equipment privately without the consent of the government is illegal without a license from the Ministry of Communications. However, the government has not taken much action to attempt to shut down the SNet, likely because there is strong self-censorship by the community to the extent that if anyone posts pornographic material or discusses politics they are permanently blocked from using the network. Both the SNet and El Paquette are largely self censored because of the value that Cubans place on accessing the content and their unwillingness to face backlash by the government, potentially risking losing access to the content.

In 2019, after talks between the supporters of SNet and the officials of the communications ministry, the SNet was joint to the national network of the Young Computer Club, a Cuban state company that offers courses and access to Internet to all the Cuban population.

See also

 Internet censorship and surveillance by country
 Censorship in Cuba
 Human rights in Cuba
 Internet in Cuba

References

External links
 "Internet Enemies: Cuba", Reporters Without Borders.
 "Cuba country report", Freedom on the Net 2018, Freedom House.
 "The Rule of Law and Cuba", a webpage with links to the Cuban Penal Code and Cuban Constitution in Spanish with some translations to English by the Cuba Center for the Advancement of Human Rights at Florida State University in Tallahassee, Florida US.
 "Internet politics in Cuba", Carlos Uxo, La Trobe University, Telecommunications Journal of Australia, Vol. 60, No. 1 (February 2010).
 "Cuban bibliography", lists fourteen reports and articles on the Internet in Cuba from 1992 to 1998, by Larry Press, Professor of Information Systems at California State University.

Cuba
Cuba
Censorship
Censorship in Cuba